Lake Jacksonville is a  reservoir located in Morgan County in the U.S. state of Illinois. The reservoir drains into Big Sandy Creek, a tributary of the Illinois River.

Description
Lake Jacksonville is actively managed for camping, power boating, and fishing recreation.  Proof of licenses and insurance are required to lower a boat into the lake.  Fishing resources center on bluegill, hybrid striped bass, largemouth bass, smallmouth bass, yellow bullhead, channel catfish, white crappie, and muskie.  A drowned coastline lake, Lake Jacksonville has approximately 21 miles of shoreline. It is 31 feet deep at its deepest point.  The nearest exit on a limited-access highway is Exit 64 on Interstate 72, near South Jacksonville, Illinois.

References

Bodies of water of Morgan County, Illinois
Jacksonville